Pinheiros is a train station on ViaMobilidade Line 9-Emerald, with connection with ViaQuatro Line 4-Yellow. It is located in the district of Pinheiros in São Paulo.

History
Pinheiros station was opened, with temporary installations, by Estrada de Ferro Sorocabana (EFS), along with the Jurubatuba branch, on 25 January 1957. The definitive installations were opened in 1958. In 1971, Fepasa incorporated EFS and began a modernization plan of the Jurubatuba branch. The station was considered of difficult access, because any passenger who leaves that station, had to, obligatorily, cross two ways of Marginal Pinheiros, one of the most crowded roads of the city, which caused many trampling cases. Pinheiros station was rebuilt, being reopened on 4 May 1981. The station was transferred to CPTM in 1996.

To give more comfort to the commuters, especially commuters from Line 5-Lilac who use Line 9-Emerald to access Line 4-Yellow, CPTM does a special operation during peak hours, where this station is used as the terminus, avoiding overcrowding in the trains.

References

Railway stations opened in 1981
1981 establishments in Brazil